The Women's 5000 metres at the 2011 World Championships in Athletics was held at the Daegu Stadium on August 30, and September 2.

Vivian Cheruiyot entered the competition as the reigning 2009 World Champion, the 2011 World Cross Country Champion, the Diamond League leader, and the fastest woman of the year (having become the fourth fastest ever with a run of 14:20.87 minutes). Ethiopians Meseret Defar and Sentayehu Ejigu had run the next quickest that season. The top twelve ranked runners prior to the championships were all either Kenyan or Ethiopian; Linet Masai, Sylvia Kibet, Mercy Cherono and Genzebe Dibaba were the other contenders from the two dominant countries. Lauren Fleshman of the United States was the fastest non-African in the final.

The final started with Hitomi Niiya taking a large early lead in an effort to steal the race.  After several laps in the spotlight she was swallowed up by the pack, which slowly disintegrated.  With a lap to go, it was three Ethiopian and four Kenyan runners to settle it.  Cheruiyot led as the group stretched out, with Defar challenging into the final straight, where Cheruiyot pulled away.  Kibet passed a fading Defar before the finish, for the silver.  Exactly the same medals as two years before.

Medalists

Records
Prior to the competition, the records were as follows:

Qualification standards

Schedule

Results

Heats
Qualification: First 5 in each heat (Q) and the next 5 fastest (q) advance to the final.

Final

References

External links
5000 metres results at IAAF website

5000
5000 metres at the World Athletics Championships
2011 in women's athletics